The Reformed Christian Church in Slovakia has 110,000 members in 205 parishes and 103 mission churches and 59 house fellowships in 10 presbyteries. The bishop is the head of the church, in contrast with other Calvinist churches.

History
Before World War I, these congregations were part of the Reformed Church in Hungary. The Reformation reached this part of the country in 1520s, first Lutheranism dominated then later Calvinism did. In 1567, four presbyteries was formed in Eastern Slovakia. In the Synod of Debrecen the Second Helvetic Confession was adopted. During the Counter Reformation, the princes of Transylvania protected the Calvinist faith and extended their supremacy to this part of Hungary.

After World War II, the church adopted its constitution. In 1925, a theological seminary was founded in Lučenec. In 1950s the denomination adopted a constitution.

After the collapse of communism, the church adopted a new constitution. It runs five primary schools, two secondary schools and one kindergarten.

Doctrine
Heidelberg Catechism
Second Helvetic Confession

Demographics
The church had 110,000 members and 204 parishes and 103 congregations and 54 mission churches in 2001 an increase of 25,000 since 1991. Hungarian speaking members are about 95,000–100,000, the church has 225 active pastors, 200 are Hungarian speaking.

There are 9 presbyteries in the denominations, the Pozsonyi, Komáromi, Barsi, Gömöri, Abaújtornai, Zempléni, Ungi, Nagymihályi, Ondova-Hernádi Presbyteries, and there are several mission congregations, like the Hungarian Reformed Church in Prague.

Interchurch relations
The Reformed Christian Church in Slovakia is a member of the World Communion of Reformed Churches, World Council of Churches and the Hungarian Reformed Communion.

References

External links
 

Reformed denominations in Europe
Christian schools in Slovakia
Hungarian diaspora